Agatha Raisin is a British comedy-drama television program, based on M. C. Beaton's book series of the same name about a former PR agent who solves crime mysteries in the Cotswolds village of Carsely.

The programme was broadcast as a pilot titled Agatha Raisin and the Quiche of Death on 26 December 2014, followed by an eight-part series that first aired on Sky One on 7 June 2016. A second season was ordered by Acorn TV on 15 January 2018. On 27 February 2019, the show was commissioned for a third season. A fourth season started filming in March 2021.

Production
On 22 August 2014, Sky announced that it had commissioned the adaptation for Sky One. It was commissioned by Cameron Roach. Sky One chief Adam MacDonald said, "Agatha Raisin and the Quiche of Death is a contemporary, sharp and witty crime drama offering for the upcoming festive season."

Agatha Raisin and the Quiche of Death began filming in September 2014. The main filming location is Biddestone, Wiltshire. On her role in the film, Ashley Jensen said, "I am absolutely delighted to be on board! It's not often a part like this comes along for a woman. Agatha Raisin is a strong forthright, independent, driven, successful woman, who is both funny and flawed, a real woman of our time."

Series two was ordered by Acorn TV, with a change to three 90-minute films as opposed to 45-minute episodes.

On 27 February 2019, the show was commissioned for series 3, which consists of four 90-minute episodes. It premiered on 28 October 2019.

Cast

Main
Ashley Jensen as Agatha Raisin.
Jamie Glover as James Lacey: Agatha's on-again, off-again love interest. 
Jason Merrells as Sir Charles Fraith: aristocratic friend of Agatha's who has a flirtation with her.
Mathew Horne as Roy Silver: former colleague of Agatha's from her Public Relations firm.
Lucy Liemann as Sarah Bloxby: wife of Reverend Jez Bloxby in series 1-3. As of series 4, she and Jez have broken up, and she is a parish curate.
Jason Barnett as the dimwitted DCI Denzel Wilkes; this character is a re-imagining of DCI Wilkes from the books, who has a contentious relationship with Agatha. 
Matt McCooey as DC Bill Wong: the local police detective who is attracted to Gemma in series 1-2. From series 3 onwards, he is attracted to Toni and becomes her fiancé at the end of series 4.
Jodie Tyack as Toni Gilmour: hired detective at Agatha's Detective Agency with an eidetic memory. She is Gemma's niece. (series 3-)
Katy Wix as Gemma Simpson: Agatha's cleaning lady; this character re-imagines Doris Simpson from the books. (series 1-2)

Recurring
Marcia Warren as Mrs. Boggle, an older resident who often assists Agatha in solving crimes.
Caroline Langrishe as Sheila Barr, sister of James Lacey (series 1, series 3-)
Taz Skylar as Harry Beam: hired detective at Agatha's Detective Agency. (series 4-)
Rhashan Stone as Jez Bloxby (played by Kobna Holdbrook-Smith in the pilot), husband of Sarah in series 1-3. As of series 4, he and Sarah have broken up. This character re-imagines Alf Bloxby from the books. (series 1)
June Watson as Mrs. Josephs. (series 1)
Tim Stern as Gene Harvey. (series 1)
Richard Durden as Mr. Boggle. (series 1)
Maddie Monti as Kyra Simpson. (series 1)
Daisy Beaumont as Mary Fortune. (series 1)

Episodes

Pilot (2014)

Series 1 (2016)

Series 2 (2018–19)

Series 3 (2019–20)

Series 4 (2021–22)

Reception
Reviewing the first series, The Independent was critical of the writing, but praised Jensen. On the other hand, The New York Times called the series 'Delightful'. The Guardian described the second series as "Campy, kitsch, silly and very fun". TV Scoop said about the show 'It’s a sexy show with loads of plot twists. You follow Agatha’s journey figuring out whodunnit in a comical way'.

Home media
Region 1: Acorn Media- Agatha Raisin, Series 1 DVD was released on 25 October 2016. Agatha Raisin, Series 2 DVD and Blu-ray were released on 7 May 2019. 
Agatha Raisin, Series 3 DVD was released on 26 May 2020.

Region 2: In the UK, Acorn released Series 1 on DVD on 1 August 2016. 
Series 2 DVD was released on 29 July 2019.

Region 4: The first four seasons have been released in Australia.

References

External links
 
 
 
 

2014 British television series debuts
2010s British comedy-drama television series
2010s British crime television series
2010s British mystery television series
2020s British comedy-drama television series
2020s British crime television series
2020s British mystery television series
British detective television series
English-language television shows
Sky UK original programming
Television shows based on British novels
Television series by Mammoth Screen
Television series by All3Media
Television shows set in the United Kingdom